The Institute of Palliative Medicine is an education, training and research centre for palliative care located in Kozhikode, India. The institute trains health care professionals in palliative care and related medical disciplines. Through its connection with Calicut Medical College and other clinics in the state of Kerala, the institute supports between 4,500 and 5,000 patients per week. This institute is an organ of Pain and Palliative Care Society, Medical College, Calicut, which was founded in 1993.

History
The institute began as an outpatient unit at Government Medical College, Calicut in 1993. In 1999, the Pain and Palliative Care Society established the 'Neighbourhood Network in Palliative Care', aimed at increasing community participation in palliative care. In 2003, the Institute was shifted to a separate building for training, research and patient care. In 2008, this institute was recognized as a WHO collaborating centre in community participation in palliative care.

Mission
The Pain & Palliative Care Society believes that individuals and families coping with a life-threatening illness deserve efficient access to services that are designed to enhance their quality of life and enable them to receive care in the setting of their choice.

Services
The outpatient department of Institute of Palliative Medicine receives about 250 patients per week. The inpatient department has 30 beds and admits around 15 patients per week. All services provided at this institute, including food and accommodation are free of cost for all patients. There are home-based care facilities to meet patients at their residences from 9 am to 5 pm every day. The home-care wing reaches out to around 750 patients per week. Round-the-clock services are available for homecare to registered patients living in Kozhikode city.

Recognition
In 1996 the World Health Organization conferred on this society, the title 'Demonstration Project' and it became their model to the developing world. WHO has since accredited the institute as a World Health Organization Collaborating Center (WHOCC).

Honours
Pain and Palliative Care Society, Kozhikode, has been chosen for a 'Person of the Year 2007' award by Indiavision, a Kerala-based Malayalam television channel. The honour is usually awarded to an outstanding individual. However this year the jury, headed by the distinguished writer M. T. Vasudevan Nair, was unanimous in selecting Pain and Palliative Care Society (PPCS). This award was received by Dr Suresh Kumar, Mr. P. K. Ashok Kumar and Dr. M. R. Rajagopal, co-founders of PPCS along with Mr. T. Balan Nair, the present secretary of PPCS at a function in Thiruvananthapuram.

References

External links 
 Institute of Palliative Medicine
 Calicut Medical Journal

Medical research institutes in India
Palliative care